Gilbert Trigano (1920–2001) was a French businessman.

1920 births
2001 deaths
People from Saint-Maurice, Val-de-Marne
20th-century French businesspeople